Firozabad(), a village in the  Bandpey-ye Sharqi of Babol county in Mazandaran province in Iran with its appellation is derived from residents of that tribe is Firouzjai.

Firuzabad or Firozabad (also Romanized as Fīrozābād) is a village in Sajjadrud Rural District, Bandpey-ye Sharqi District, Babol County, Mazandaran Province, Iran. At the 2006 census, its population was 439, in 112 families.

The village with independent code villages in the  Bandpey-ye Sharqi (eastern Bandpey) of Babol county in Sajjadrud Rural District. The village from the north to the villages Balaganjkola  and Felka, from the East to the office complex and the center of Bandpey-ye Sharqi (eastern Bandpey) and city of galangal, from the West to the village Eedmolla، And from the south to the forest land is limited.

At the 2011 census, its population was 580, in 157 families.

The village has 157 households, and 1390 population and housing census of 580 inhabitants. The town combining several villages before the glorious Islamic Revolution, Shah Kola, Barfchalsy, and Lapper, had a name named Firozabad [3] renamed. This is because most of its inhabitants, the Firouzjai tribe, and since the Islamic Revolution, referred to the name.

And since the Islamic Revolution referred to the name. The village, ever since the Islamic Revolution, has been the council. And after approval by Parliament and the official announcement of the institution, courses will be held in the village council elections.

And the 2007 Civil and semi-government institution administering the Ministry of Interior licensing is deployed in the village. And is to serve the people involved.

The village is also blessed with water, electricity, telephone, and natural gas.

And the location is good. And in terms of proximity and access to facilities and administrative centers section (Bandpey-sharqi) in such way that most offices, including the county Civil Registration Department, Imam Khomeini Relief Committee (RA), Municipalities, Electricity Distribution Company, the Veterinary Office office of the Council (Bandpey-sharqi), the public and revolutionary court (Bandpey-sharqi), a cultural complex of Imam Khomeini (RA), department of natural resources and forestry, and emergency adjacent to and within two minutes of the village are located. Bandpey Hospital, also in the village, is under construction.

Despite the change in Firozabad-style houses, a handful still lives in the old-style houses built of wood.

Firozabad village, Tekyeh، Husayniyyeh of Sayyed shahada, the mosque of Amir almomenin(A), two elementary schools, and a middle school there.

The entire village population, the original tribe Firouzjai including Adabi, Biglari, Gerizad, Kazemnasab, Rahmani, Perijai Mughaddam, and Most of the inhabitants are agriculture and animal husbandry.

References 

Populated places in Babol County